Merged content from Peruvian Primera División Femenina to here

The Primera División Femenina officially named Liga Femenina (currently known as Liga Femenina Pluspetrol 2023 for sponsorship reasons), is the top tournament of women's association football in Peru, organized by the Peruvian Football Federation through its Women's Football Commission. The competition, as an official tournament, was created in 1996 under de name of "Campeonato Metropolitano de Fútbol Femenino" (Metropolitan women's football championship), followed by the "Campeonato Nacional de Fútbol Femenino" (Peruvian women's football championship) which was renamed later as "Copa Femenina"and currently is designated as "Liga Femenina". The champion qualifies to the Copa Libertadores Femenina.

History

Metropolitan women's football championship 

Like the men's tournament, the Peruvian Primera División Femenina began on a regional and amateur basis. On 1996 the Peruvian female football competitions started with the creation of the "Campeonato Metropolitano de Fútbol Femenino" (Metropolitan women's footbal championship) organized by the Peruvian Football Federation and played with sport clubs from Lima and Callao. The champion of the first edition was the team of Club Universitario. On 2000 the club Sporting Cristal became three-time champion by getting the titles of 1998, 1999 and 2000. Later, the team of Club Universitario equaled that record by getting the 2001, 2002 and 2003 titles.

Women's football national championship 
On 2008 the Peruvian Football Federation modified the competition scheme to give it a national scope, setting the tournament in three fases: provincial, regional and national. With this new competition format, the tournamente was renamed as "Campeonato Nacional de Fútbol Femenino" (women's football national championship), and incorporated the former tournament (Campeonato Metropolitano de Fútbol Femenino) as the Region IV (Lima & Callao) of its regional stage.

Since 2009 the champion qualifies for the Copa Libertadores Femenina. the first champion under this new format was the team of White Star. That same year, the Peruvian Football Federation and the FIFA agreed to incorporate representatives of the Women's football Championship into the FPF Bases Assembly, thus granting them greater participation in the decisions of the governing body of Peruvian football On 2012 the team of JC Sport Girls became three-times champion, while on 2016 the team of Club Universitario de Deportes won the tri-championship for the second time. As of 2017, the Peruvian Football Federation decided to accommodate its calendar to that of Conmebol so that the local women's tournaments would not intersect with the development of the Copa Libertadores Femenina. Until that time, the tournament schedule had no relation to the annual calendar; that is, the national championship of one year was defined the following year.

Liga Femenina 
In 2020 the Peruvian Football Federation decides to professionalize women's football for which it issues Resolution No. 014-2020-FPF that provides for "strengthening the traditional National System of Women's football Championships, hereinafter referred to as FPF Liga Femenina". The first season was expected to take place in 2020, but was delayed until 2021 due to COVID-19 pandemic. In 2021, this new format was resumed and it was played under the name of FPF Liga Femenina and under the auspices of the private television network Movistar TV.

Format
Currently, the season is played in two stages: First stage and Final stage (Playoffs). The First stage is played under a single round-robin format with the 13 teams playing each other once. The Final stage is contested by teams ranked 1st to 6th in the First stage, with teams ranked 1st and 2nd directly qualified for semifinals and teams ranked 3rd to 6th qualified for a previous qualifying round or repechage to reach the semifinals. Winners of semifinals play the final to decide the national champion.

2023 teams

List of champions

Amateur league (1996–2019)

Campeonato Metropolitano (1996–2007)

Campeonato Nacional de Fútbol Femenino (2008–2017)

Copa Perú Femenina (2018–2019)

Professional league (2020–present)

Liga Femenina:  (2020–present)

Footnotes

A. In 2005, the League not played due to Peruvian participation in the 2005 Bolivarian Games

Titles by club

Top scorers

External links
Peru – List of Women Champions at RSSSF

References 

Football leagues in Peru
Women's association football leagues in South America
Sports leagues established in 1996
Women's football in Peru
1996 establishments in Peru